Pinedale Elementary School is a historic school building located in Pinedale, Arizona surrounded by Ponderosa Pine trees.  It is owned by Navajo County and leased to Pinedale, Heritage, Inc. a 501c(3). 

The building was added to the National Register of Historic Places in 2002.

It is a one-story  building.  It has 25 nine-over-nine windows.

References

External links
Pinedale Heritage website

Schools in Navajo County, Arizona
School buildings completed in 1939
National Register of Historic Places in Navajo County, Arizona
School buildings on the National Register of Historic Places in Arizona
Former school buildings in the United States
1939 establishments in Arizona